Frane Cota (29 September 1898 – 20 January 1951) was a Croatian sculptor. His work was part of the sculpture event in the art competition at the 1924 Summer Olympics.

References

1898 births
1951 deaths
19th-century Croatian sculptors
20th-century Croatian sculptors
Croatian sculptors
Olympic competitors in art competitions
People from Knin